The women's team foil competition at the 2018 Asian Games in Jakarta was held on 23 August at the Jakarta Convention Center. South Korean team was the defending champion in this event after won the last five gold medals from 1998 to 2014. Japan clinched their first gold medal in this event at the Asian Games after defeated the Chinese team with the score 35–34 in the final. China captured the silver medal, while Singapore and South Korean team won the bronze medal.

Schedule
All times are Western Indonesia Time (UTC+07:00)

Seeding
The teams were seeded taking into account the results achieved by competitors representing each team in the individual event.

Results

Final standing

References

Results

External links
 Fencing at the 2018 Asian Games - Women's team foil

Women's foil team